Ežerėlis (literally: little lake) is a city in Kaunas County, Lithuania. It is a fairly new settlement as it started developing only in 1918 when a peat digging enterprise was established in the Ežerėlis Bog. According to the census of 1923, it had 132 residents. In 1959 the town reached the population of 2,200 and remained fairly stable since then.

Cities in Lithuania
Cities in Kaunas County